The Medford Giants were a minor league baseball team based in Medford, Oregon. The Giants were members of the Class A-Short Season Northwest League from 1967-1968 and were an affiliate of the San Francisco Giants.

History
In early 1967 it was announced that Rouge Valley Baseball, Inc. had secured a Northwest League franchise. The club signed a player development contract with the San Francisco Giants. Adopting their parent club's moniker the club began play in the summer of 1967 as the Medford Giants. In their innagural season the Giants finished with a record of 51-33. The Giants and Eugene Emeralds were in a dead heat down the stretch. Medford swept the Tri-City Atoms in a season finale double-header to finish one game ahead of Eugene in the standings to claim the Northwest League pennant. 

There was uncertainty as to whether the franchise would remain in Medford due to a dispute over ballpark rent. Jackson County Commissioners sought to raise rent, an increase that owner Joseph Graham strongly opposed. The county agreed to maintain the same rental rate, which secured the Giants return for the 1968 season. 
After the completion of the season, citing a lack of available players, San Francisco ended their affiliation with Medford. Medford signed on with the Los Angeles Dodgers and became the Rogue Valley Dodgers.

Season-by-season record

Notable alumni

  George Foster (1968) 5 x MLB All-Star; 1977 NL Most Valuable Player

 Gary Lavelle (1968) 2 x MLB All-Star

References

External links
Stats Crew Medford Giants

Defunct Northwest League teams
San Francisco Giants minor league affiliates
Defunct baseball teams in Oregon
Sports in Medford, Oregon
1967 establishments in Oregon
1968 disestablishments in Oregon
Baseball teams established in 1967
Sports clubs disestablished in 1968
Baseball teams disestablished in 1968